The canton of Cluses is an administrative division of the Haute-Savoie department, southeastern France. Its borders were modified at the French canton reorganisation which came into effect in March 2015. Its seat is in Cluses.

It consists of the following communes:

Châtillon-sur-Cluses
Cluses
Marnaz
Mieussy
Mont-Saxonnex
Morillon
Nancy-sur-Cluses
Le Reposoir
La Rivière-Enverse
Saint-Sigismond
Samoëns
Scionzier
Sixt-Fer-à-Cheval
Taninges
Thyez
Verchaix

References

Cantons of Haute-Savoie